Bree Amer (born 17 August 1982 ) is an Australian television personality.

Biography
Amer was a contestant on Big Brother Australia 2004 from the Gold Coast, in Queensland, and the first housemate of Big Brother Australia to re-enter the House when, hours after her eviction, it was discovered the votes were miscalculated. She was returned to the House the night after, and a few days after that, in a special eviction show, the actual person to have received the most votes, Wesley Dening, was evicted.

Having worked in theatre restaurants, Amer co-hosted the Big Brother Friday Night Live games in the 2005 series of Big Brother Australia with Mike Goldman and fellow 2004 series Housemate, Ryan Fitzgerald. The same hosting team went on to front Friday Night Games in early 2006, and later continued as hosts of Big Brother Friday Night Live in the 2007 and 2008 series of Big Brother. Amer appeared in the May 2006 issue of Ralph magazine.  She also has appeared briefly in an advertisement for Donut King. She was a presenter for Channel 10's New Year's Eve 2006 broadcast in Sydney. 

She co-hosted the Australian show Download along with Ryan Fitzgerald and Mike Goldman. In May 2011 Sydney-based author, Amanda Cole, issued Who Needs Prince Charming?, a self-realisation book for women, which collated contributions from 35 Australian women including Amer, Bianca Dye, Camilla Franks, Kathryn Eisman, Bessie Bardot, Molly Contogeorge, Tania Zaetta and Cindy Pan.

Personal life

On 29 July 2006, The Sydney Morning Herald reported that a doctor noticed a lump on Amer's neck while watching a broadcast of Friday Night Live, and urged her to see a doctor. Amer has since undergone two surgeries for removal of thyroid cancer, and also had radiation therapy. However, she is now healthy again.
Bree married TV producer Evan Wilkes on 7 November 2015 and together they have had two sons, Archie who was stillborn in April 2015, and Hunter who was born February 2017.

References

External links
 

Australian game show hosts
Big Brother (Australian TV series) contestants
People from the Gold Coast, Queensland
1982 births
Living people